Qaleh Juq (also Romanized as Qal‘eh Jūq; also known as Qal‘eh Joq) is a village in Sanjabad-e Shomali Rural District, in the Central District of Kowsar County, Ardabil Province, Iran. At the 2006 census, its population was 91, in 15 families.

References 

Tageo

Towns and villages in Kowsar County